Bhadragol is a  Nepali sitcom that airs every Friday at 8:50 pm NST on Nepal Television. It was one of the most viewed television programs in Nepal. But the popularity of show has declined dramatically with almost new set of characters and team members in the show. The show was formerly produced by Subash Karki and then Media Hub Pvt. Ltd. produced the show. Jyoti Kafle and Ashok Dhital are the writers and the directors of the show. The story is based on village life. The main cast left the show due to some misunderstandings and started another one called-'Sakkigoni' with the recurring cast playing the same roles in entirely other but similar village where alike events happen. This show after the event was halted for a month and aired again with nearly entire new cast to  negative reviews. This show has aired to huge views on Youtube Platform for about 3–4 years.

Plot summary

Characters
Pade and jigri's team members are working in bhadragol but now they work in sakkigoni.

Cast 
Arjun Ghimire (Padey)  
Abishkar Rijal (Hacker)
Kumar Kattel (Jigri)
Shankar Acharya (Baristhe)
Kamalmani Nepal (Khupika Bau)
Dipak Acharya (Kaku)
CP Pudasaini (Dhature)
Sagar Lamsal (Bale)
Hari Niraula (Cockroach)
Rakshya Shrestha (Rakshya)
Govinda Koirala (Jayante)
Madhusudan Pathak (Site Ba) 
Priyana Acharya (Munni)
Shaan Niroula 
Sita Devi Ghimire

See also
 Sakkigoni
 Hakka Hakki
 Meri Bassai
 Jire khursani

References

External links
 Media Hub Nepal

Nepalese television series
Nepalese television sitcoms
2013 Nepalese television series debuts
2010s Nepalese television series